Lukáš Rešetár (born 28 April 1984), is a Czech futsal player who plays for Era-Pack Chrudim and the Czech Republic national futsal team.

References

External links
UEFA profile

1984 births
Living people
Futsal forwards
Czech men's futsal players
People from Aš
Sportspeople from the Karlovy Vary Region